This is a list of radio networks and stations in Finland and elsewhere broadcasting exclusively or partly in the Finnish language.

Yleisradio

National stations 

 
 YleX
 Yle Radio Suomi
 Yle Vega
 
 Yle X3M

Regional stations

Yle Radio Suomi 

 Helsinki
 Hämeenlinna
 Joensuu
 Jyväskylä
 Kajaani
 Kemi
 Kokkola
 Kotka
 Kuopio
 Lahti
 Lappeenranta
 Mikkeli
 Oulu
 Pohjanmaa (Vaasa and Seinäjoki)
 Pori
 Rovaniemi
 Sámi Radio
 Tampere
 Turku

Yle Vega 

 Huvudstadsregionen (Helsinki)
 Västnyland (Raseborg)
 Östnyland (Porvoo)
 Österbotten (Vaasa)
 Åboland (Turku)

Commercial radio

National distribution 

 
  
 
 
 
 
 
 
 Radio Dei
 
 Radio Nova
 
 
 Radio Rock
 Radio Sputnik
 Radio Suomipop

Local distribution 

 Aito Kajaus
 Auran Aallot
 Business FM
 Finest FM
 FUN Tampere
 Iskelmä
 Järviradio
 Lähiradio
 Metro Helsinki
 Pispalan Radio
 Radio 957
 Radio City
 Radio Helsinki
 Radio Kompassi
 Radio Kuopio
 Radio Mikkeli
 Radio Moreeni
 Radio Musa
 Radio Pooki
 Radio Pori
 Radio Pro
 Radio Ramona
 Radio Sandels
 Radio SUN
 Radio Vaasa
 Radio Voima
 Sea FM
 Steel FM
 Spirit FM
 HitMix

Stations broadcasting in Finnish outside Finland

Public service stations (Sweden)

See also
 Media of Finland

Fin